Simmons College of Kentucky is a private  historically black college in Louisville, Kentucky.  Founded in 1879, it is the nation's 107th HBCU and is accredited by the Association for Biblical Higher Education.

History

Beginnings
In August 1865, 12 Black Baptist churches met at Fifth Street Baptist Church in Louisville and organized the state Convention of Colored Baptist Churches in Kentucky, led by the pastor Henry Adams.

Because there was no place in the state for Blacks to obtain a college education, members of the Convention soon began discussing the need to create a school for the training of Negroes, many of whom were one generation removed from slavery. Having first given consideration to Frankfort as the home to the school, members of the Convention instead decided in 1869 to locate what would be known as the Kentucky Normal Theological Institute in Louisville.

It was not until 1879, however, that any definite steps were taken for the opening of the school. In November of that year the trustees of the Convention of Colored Baptist Church in Kentucky purchased  of land on the corner of 7th & Kentucky Street in Louisville that immediately served as the campus for the school.

Growth
 That same year, the school opened its doors under the direction of its first President Elijah P. Marrs. After a brief one-year tenure, Marrs was succeeded by William J. Simmons. Simmons was an ex-slave who had greatly developed Howard University's teacher training programs. It was under the leadership of Simmons that the school would begin to flourish in such a way that it would eventually be renamed "Simmons University" in appreciation for his contributions. By 1893 the school had 159 students, and by 1900 it was offering professional degrees in nursing and law in cooperation with the University of Louisville.

During his 10-year tenure (1880–1890), the school became a full university and expanded its offerings to include liberal arts, college preparatory courses and medical, law, business, music, and theological departments. Additionally, the school was the home to competitive football, basketball, and baseball teams.

Simmons University continued to grow and prosper. In 1894, Simmons was succeeded by Charles L. Purce, who was president until his death in 1905. In 1907, the school, now called State University entered into an affiliation agreement with the Louisville National Medical College to merge the two colleges. In 1918, Charles Parrish became President of the school and improved the school's endowment and academic offerings.

Decline

The effects of the Great Depression found their way to the school. In 1930, the university was forced to sell its property due to a foreclosure on the mortgage. As a result, the school significantly scaled back its offerings. The University of Louisville purchased the bulk of the property for the site of Louisville Municipal College, U of L's black branch under segregation. As part of the purchase agreement, Simmons agreed to offer only religious instruction. In 1934, the University of Louisville purchased the remainder of the property, and Simmons relocated to 18th and Dumesnil. In 1982 the school was renamed Simmons Bible College to more adequately reflect its mission.

Renaissance
In 2005, Kevin W. Cosby became the 13th President and subsequently changed the name of the school to Simmons College of Kentucky to reflect the school's mission to prepare Christians for ministry, while reinstating its initial mission of general education. In 2006, the school bought and moved back to the original campus.

Controversies 
In 2015, Simmons president Kevin Cosby attempted to broker a deal to bring a methane plant to historic Schenly Distillery in exchange for scholarship money and partial use of the facility. The deal was opposed by community residents who felt that the college and Star BioEnergy, the corporation seeking to open the plant, dismissed their health concerns.

Academics
Simmons College of Kentucky has developed four distinct educational programs, plus a commitment to a fifth program objective, with a focus on an academic, research-based, faith-based approach to community involvement, interaction, and development.

Non-degree programs include a certificate and a diploma in Christian Ministry Studies. Degree programs include the Bachelor of Theology, Bachelor of Arts, and Associate degree. Since 2018 the Baptist Seminary of Kentucky has offered a Master of Divinity degree that can be earned entirely through classes taken on the Simmons College campus.

Simmons used to have a medical school but it closed in 1912 along with many bad medical schools cited by the Flexner Report. The medical school was originally founded as the Louisville National Medical College, which merged with Simmons in 1907.

Athletics
The Simmons athletic teams are called the Falcons. The college is a member of the Division II level of the National Christian Collegiate Athletic Association (NCCAA) within the Mid-East Region.

Simmons competes in two intercollegiate varsity sports: Men's sports include basketball; while women's sports include basketball.

History
The 2006–07 school year was the first time since 1930 that the school sponsored an athletic program.

Notable people
 Artishia Gilbert – first African-American woman physician in Kentucky
 Arenia Mallory – educator and civil rights activist
 Samuel Plato – architect
 W. J. Simmons – ex-slave who was the college's second president and namesake

See also
History of Louisville, Kentucky

References

External links

 
 Official athletics website
 Simmons University records

 
Educational institutions established in 1879
Universities and colleges in Louisville, Kentucky
University of Louisville
African-American history in Louisville, Kentucky
Local landmarks in Louisville, Kentucky
NJCAA athletics
1879 establishments in Kentucky
Private universities and colleges in Kentucky
Historically black universities and colleges in the United States